"Fools Rush In" (1940) is a popular song. The lyrics were written by Johnny Mercer with music by Rube Bloom.

History of the song according to The Billboard, September 28, 1940 issue, page 34:
Four years ago (1936) "Fools Rush In" was known as "Shangraila," composed by Ruby Bloom and introduced in one of the production numbers at the Chez Paree, Chicago. Little was heard of it until this past summer when Ruby played it for Bregman, Vocco and Conn, New York music publishers, who suggested that new lyrics be written. Johnny Mercer was called in and he supplied the words, which have 
been widely accepted by the public. (The words originate in "An Essay on Criticism", written by Alexander Pope in the 18th century.)

First recordings
The major hits at the time of introduction were: 
Tony Martin, (31 March 1940)
Glenn Miller with Ray Eberle, (31 March 1940) 
Tommy Dorsey with Frank Sinatra (29 March 1940)
 Anne Shelton and Ambrose (August 1940)
 Harry James (Varsity 8264, 1940)

Rick Nelson recording
In 1963, Rick Nelson recorded his version, and was included in his Rick Nelson Sings "For You" LP and was an enormous hit, reaching #12 on the Billboard pop chart and #24 on the Hot R&B Singles chart.  This recording was the most famous version of this song.

Other notable recordings 
Billy Eckstine (1947)
 Stan Getz – Complete Studio Sessions: Stan Getz & Jimmy Raney (1952)
 Jo Stafford – Starring Jo Stafford (1953)
 The Hi-Lo's – Listen!... to the Hi-Lo's (1954)
 Zoot Sims - Zoot! (1956)
 Julie London – Lonely Girl (1956), and Julie London (1964)
 Keely Smith – I Wish You Love (1957)
 The Four Freshmen – The Freshman Year (1961)
 Stan Kenton – The Romantic Approach (1961)
 Brook Benton – Songs I Love to Sing (1960)
 Shirley Bassey – Shirley Bassey (1961)
 Doris Day with André Previn – Duet (1962)
 Al Hirt – Trumpet and Strings (1962)
 Etta James – Etta James Sings for Lovers (1962)
 Brenda Lee – Sincerely, Brenda Lee (1962)
 Lesley Gore – Lesley Gore Sings of Mixed-Up Hearts (1963)
 Dean Martin – Dream with Dean (1964)
 Johnny Hartman – Unforgettable Songs by Johnny Hartman (1966)
 Elvis Presley – Elvis Now (1972) This recording followed Ricky Nelson's style.
 Susannah McCorkle – The Songs of Johnny Mercer (1977)
 Bow Wow Wow – covered the track on their 1980 MC-only debut, Your Cassette Pet Debbie Byrne – The Persuader (1985)
 Rosemary Clooney - Midnight in the Garden of Good and Evil (1997)
 The Morning Benders – Bedroom Covers (2008)
 Cliff Richard – Bold as Brass (2010)
She & Him covered Ricky Nelson's version for Levi's Pioneer Sessions in 2010.
 Peggy Sue – Peggy Sue Plays the Songs of Scorpio Rising (2012)
 Norah Jones with Harold Mabern – Afro Blue (2014)
 Youn Sun Nah – She Moves On'' (2017)
 Disclosure – "Where Angels Fear To Tread" (2018 single)

References

1940 songs
1940 singles
Songs with music by Rube Bloom
Songs with lyrics by Johnny Mercer
Mildred Bailey songs
Bow Wow Wow songs
Al Hirt songs
Ricky Nelson songs